Socket SP5 (LGA 6096) is a zero insertion force land grid array CPU socket designed by AMD supporting its Zen 4-based Epyc server processors that launched on November 10, 2022.

History 
In June 2017, with the launch of the first generation Epyc server processors, AMD introduced the SP3 socket. The SP3 socket covered three generations of Epyc processors, including Naples, Rome and Milan. AMD's Genoa processors contain up to 96 Zen 4 cores compared to Milan's maximum of 64 cores. In support of Genoa's 96 cores, AMD introduced the SP5 socket with 2002 more contact pins than the SP3 socket to provide greater power delivery and signal integrity. SP5 can provide a peak power of up to 700W. 

The SP5 socket will support future Epyc processors, codenamed Bergamo, which has up to 128 Zen 4c cores and are set to debut in the first half of 2023. Additionally, some Bergamo processors will use SP5's successor, Socket SP6.

Features 
 Supports 12 channels of DDR5 ECC RAM with 6TB maximum capacity per socket. Using a dual socket system can allow up to 12TB RAM capacity.
 Supports 128 lanes of PCIe 5.0

See also
Socket AM5, contemporary desktop socket from AMD in use since 2022

References

AMD server sockets